No. 2: Original Motion Picture Soundtrack is the soundtrack to the New Zealand film No. 2. It was released alongside the film in 2006 by EMI

The soundtrack has been compiled by Don McGlashan and features the soulful and urban sounds of Tha Feelstyle, Che Fu, and Trinity Roots.

The lead single from the soundtrack, "Bathe In the River", was written by Don McGlashan and performed by an all-star cast including the vocal talents of Hollie Smith.

Don McGlashan won the 2006 APRA Silver Scroll for "Bathe in the River".

Track listing
"The Medicine" - Tha Feelstyle
"Bathe in the River" - Mt Raskil Preservation Society featuring Hollie Smith
"Overture/Sai Levuka" - Don McGlashan
"Waka" - Che Fu
"Early Morning No. 2" - Don McGlashan
"Mt. Roskill/Chasing the Pig" - Don McGlashan
"Hold Tight" - Che Fu
"Wai Ni Bu Ni Ovalau" - Fijian Festival Performers
"Nanna Takes Control/Meke (Action Dance)" - Don McGlashan
"Core 'ngrato" - Shaun Dixon
"Nanna's Entrance" - Don McGlashan
"Chulu Chululu" - Mila with Eddie Lund And His Tahitians
"Break It To Pieces" - Tha Feelstyle
"Home, Land and Sea" - TrinityRoots
"Intermezzo from Cavalleria Rusticana" - Christchurch Symphony Orchestra

References
Don McGlashan and No. 2, APRAP, December 2005, p13.

External links
 APRAP, December 2005

Compilation albums by New Zealand artists
Comedy-drama film soundtracks
2006 compilation albums
Pop compilation albums
2006 soundtrack albums